The Boeuf River is a tributary of the Ouachita River in the U.S. states of Arkansas and Louisiana.

The Boeuf River's name comes from the French word , which means "ox".

See also
 List of rivers of Arkansas
 List of rivers of Louisiana

References

Rivers of Arkansas
Rivers of Louisiana
Tributaries of the Red River of the South
Rivers of Chicot County, Arkansas
Ouachita River